National Cycle Network (NCN) Route 66 is a Sustrans National Route that runs from Kingston upon Hull to Manchester via Beverley, York and Leeds.

Between Pocklington and York it forms part of the Way of the Roses challenge route. In 1998 the section of route 66 between Hull and York was branded The White Rose cycle route. This branding is no longer in use.

Route

Hull to York

The route leaves Hull via its Northern suburbs. Between Cottingham and passing Beverley Minster, it coincides with National Cycle Route 1, via the A164 and A1035 roads to the villages of Cherry Burton and Etton. Beyond Etton Route 1 departs to the north, and Route 66 runs along minor roads parallel to the Hudson Way, a rail trail along the former York to Beverley Line. The route heads generally westwards, passing south of Goodmanham (where it is crossed by the Yorkshire Wolds Way) and then through the centre of Market Weighton.

From Market Weighton, Route 66 takes a more northerly turn and follows minor roads to Pocklington via Londesborough and Burnby. Beyond Pocklington it heads northwest to Stamford Bridge, where it crosses the River Derwent (and the Minster Way, which also connects Beverley and York) via the disused railway viaduct. It then heads southwest along an off-road route to Dunnington and thence to Murton, home of the Yorkshire Museum of Farming on the outskirts of York. At Osbaldwick the route briefly follows the line of the former Derwent Valley Light Railway towards the city centre. At a junction with Route 658  the route heads through the southern suburbs of the city, passing through the campus of York University to cross the River Ouse via the Millennium Bridge.

The section of Route 66 between Pocklington  and York   is part of the Way of the Roses challenge ride.

York to Leeds
Route 66 between York and Leeds is still under development. From York's Millennium Bridge it follows the off-road York-Selby cycle path, which is part of Route 65. As of Summer 2017 this section was unsigned.

The route between Tadcaster and Bramham has yet to be determined.

Running south from Bramham parallel to the A1(M) to Aberford, the route then takes an off-road track, through the Parlington estate to Garforth and hence on and off-road sections through Temple Newsam and into Leeds via the River Aire towpath.

Leeds to Manchester

From Leeds, the route follows the Leeds-Liverpool canal out of West Leeds and up to Shipley. At Shipley, the canal continues as National Cycle Route 696.  The route goes south from Shipley towards Bradford city centre on a mainly off-road route. Major improvements to this section of the route were constructed in 2018.   From Bradford City Park, the route goes towards Bowling Park via the Big Red Bridge and up to Bierley and passes beneath the M606 to Low Moor. At Low Moor, the route joins the off-road Spen Valley Greenway - following  a former railway trackbed to Dewsbury. The route is broken from Dewsbury to Brighouse. At Brighouse, the route follows the Calder and Hebble Navigation to Sowerby Bridge, then there is a mixed off-road from Sowerby Bridge to Manchester closely following the Rochdale canal through Hebden Bridge, Todmorden, Littleborough and Rochdale.

References 

Sustrans - Route 66 

Transport in the East Riding of Yorkshire
Transport in North Yorkshire
Transport in West Yorkshire
Cycling in Yorkshire
Rail trails in England